2C-B-aminorex (2C-B-AR) is a recreational designer drug with psychedelic effects. It is a substituted aminorex derivative which was first identified in Sweden in June 2019.

See also 
 2C-B
 2C-B-PP
 BOB (psychedelic)
 4,4'-DMAR
 4'-Fluoro-4-methylaminorex
 List of aminorex analogues

References 

Designer drugs